Hadi Tabatabaei (born on April 13, 1973 in Rasht) is a retired Iranian football goalkeeper.

Following Tabatabaei's retirement in 2006 he became a fully qualified coach and holds an Asian Football Confederation 'A' level coaching licence.

International career
Tabatabaei debuted for Iran versus the Maldives on June 11, 1997

Tabatabaei was a member for Iran national football team between 1997 and 2000, but after the injury right before the Asian Cup 2000 he was never called up for national team again. His most memorable games for the national team was a friendly match versus Denmark on October 10, 1999 in Copenhagen. Following that performance Iranian newspapers dubbed him the Lion of Copenhagen.

References

1973 births
Iranian footballers
Iran international footballers
Association football goalkeepers
Keshavarz players
Pas players
Tarbiat Yazd players
Esteghlal F.C. players
Fajr Sepasi players
Saba players
People from Rasht
Living people
Bahman players
Sportspeople from Gilan province